Alexandrovsk is a town in Perm Krai, Russia, located on the Lytva River (Kama's tributary),  northeast of Perm, the administrative center of the krai. Population:

History
It was founded in 1805. It was granted urban-type settlement status in 1929 and town status in 1951.

Administrative and municipal status
Within the framework of administrative divisions, it is, together with two work settlements (Vsevolodo-Vilva and Yayva) and thirty-five rural localities, incorporated as the town of krai significance of Alexandrovsk—an administrative unit with the status equal to that of the districts. As a municipal division, the town of Alexandrovsk, together with six rural localities, is incorporated as Alexandrovskoye Urban Settlement within Alexandrovsky Municipal District and serves as the municipal district's administrative center, while the two work settlements and twenty-nine rural localities are grouped into two urban settlements and one rural settlement within Alexandrovsky Municipal District.

Notable residents 

Alexander Beloborodov (1891–1938), Bolshevik revolutionary, Soviet politician
Konstantin Mekhonoshin (1889–1938), Bolshevik revolutionary, Soviet military figure and politician

References

Notes

Sources

External links
Official website of Alexandrovsk 
Directory of organizations in Alexandrovsk 

Cities and towns in Perm Krai
 
Solikamsky Uyezd